Andrei Valeryevich Kovalenko (born 20 March 1970) is a former Belarusian professional footballer.

Club career
He made his professional debut in the Soviet Second League in 1987 for Gomselmash Gomel.

Personal life
His younger brother Konstantin Kovalenko also played football professionally.

Honours
Terek Grozny
 Russian Cup winner: 2003–04

References

1970 births
Sportspeople from Gomel
Living people
Soviet footballers
Belarusian footballers
Association football midfielders
Belarusian expatriate footballers
Belarus international footballers
Russian Premier League players
Expatriate footballers in Russia
FC Gomel players
FC Belshina Bobruisk players
FC Kuban Krasnodar players
FC Rotor Volgograd players
FC Rostov players
FC Fakel Voronezh players
FC Rubin Kazan players
FC Akhmat Grozny players
FC Luch Vladivostok players
FC Dynamo Stavropol players
FC Arsenal Tula players
FC Slavyansk Slavyansk-na-Kubani players
FC Kristall Smolensk players